Jonathan Hadary (born October 11, 1948) is an American actor.

Early life and education 
Born in Chicago, Illinois and raised in Bethesda, Maryland, Hadary arrived at Tufts University already an accomplished actor.  He was cast in many shows at Tufts, both student and faculty directed.  During his sophomore year, he became an understudy for the Boston company of You're a Good Man Charlie Brown.  This being the Vietnam era, the actor playing Charlie Brown was drafted.  The actor playing Schroeder was moved to the Charlie Brown role, and Hadary took the part of Schroeder.  He finished the Boston run of the show and the toured with it for some time.

Career 
Hadary made his New York City stage debut in the 1976 Playwrights Horizons staging of Albert Innaurato's Gemini. Critical acclaim for the off-Broadway production resulted in it transferring to PAF Playhouse and then to Circle Repertory Company, and finally to Broadway, where it ran for 1819 performances. Hadary worked off-Broadway again on the 1979 Howard Ashman and Alan Menken musical adaptation of Kurt Vonnegut's God Bless You, Mr. Rosewater, Ted Tally's 1980 play Coming Attractions, and the 1981 Tom Lehrer revue Tom Foolery. The following year he returned to Broadway to replace Harvey Fierstein in Torch Song Trilogy.

A member of the acting company at Circle Repertory Company, Hadary won an Obie Award for his performance in the 1985 William M. Hoffman play As Is  at  Circle Rep, and again, the play moved to Broadway, where it was nominated for three Tony Awards and won the Drama Desk Award for Best Play. In 1989, he co-starred opposite Tyne Daly in Gypsy, which earned him Tony Award and Drama Desk Award nominations. Hadary also played James Garfield assassin Charles Guiteau in the original off-Broadway production of Stephen Sondheim and John Weidman's musical Assassins.

Hadary played the role of Roy Cohn in the national touring production of Millennium Approaches, the first part of Tony Kushner's theatrical epic Angels in America in 1994-95. He also appeared in the 2006 revival of Awake and Sing!, for which he shared the Drama Desk Award for Outstanding Ensemble Performance. He also portrayed King Arthur in the Broadway production of Monty Python's Spamalot. In 2019 he played tribune Sicinius in The Public Theater's production of Coriolanus, and  The Public's production of an updated version of A Bright Room Called Day by Tony Kushner.

Hadary's feature film credits include A Time to Kill, Private Parts, and Intolerable Cruelty. On television he has appeared in Miami Vice, Party of Five, Law & Order, Law & Order: Criminal Intent, Hope and Faith, Sex and the City, Louie, Veep, The Heart, She Holler, and Russian Doll.

Filmography

Film

Television

References

External links
 
 
 

1948 births
American male film actors
American male musical theatre actors
American male television actors
Male actors from Chicago
Living people
Tufts University alumni
People from Bethesda, Maryland
Male actors from Maryland
20th-century American male actors
21st-century American male actors